Banach, a Polish-language surname
 16856 Banach, a minor planet 
 Banach algebra, an associative algebra 
 Banach space, a complete normed vector space